A shooting thaler is a silver coin in thaler size minted to commemorate a Schützenfest (French: Fête de tir) or free shooting (German: Freischiessen, French: Tir libre) in Switzerland.

In a narrow sense, Swiss Schützentaler are the silver coins equal in size and weight to the Swiss 5 francs coin minted on the occasion of one of the Eidgenössische Schützenfeste, or federal shooting festivals. Two such coins were issued by the cantonal mints of Graubünden (1842, denominated at 4 Swiss francs), and Glarus (1847, denominated at 40 Batzen) prior to the establishment of the Federal Mint. Sometimes included as "shooting thaler" is a double thaler (10 francs) coin minted by  Geneva   and donated as cash prizes to the 1851 festival.

The Federal Mint has issued fifteen such coins with the nominal value of five francs, between 1855 and 1885. 
These coins were not intended as legal tender, even though they were issued by the federal mint with a nominal face value. Because they were minted to the official specifications of the 5 francs coin, they were nevertheless circulated de facto. After 1885, the federal mint was dissuaded from minting these semi-official coins on the part of the Latin Monetary Union. After the demise of the Monetary Union, the Swiss federal mint issued two further Schützentaler, in 1934 and 1939, for a total of twenty distinct Schützentaler (3 cantonal, 17 federal). Of the 22 cantons of the Swiss Confederation, 18 are represented in these coins, the exceptions being Uri, Appenzell, Aargau and Valais.

Most of the designs in the series depict strongly patriotic themes, frequently depicting the federal personification Helvetia alongside a cantonal or city personification, in some cases alluding to specific historical events.
The entire series can be distinguished from the much more varied genre of shooting medals (Schützenmedaillen) by their adherence to the specifications of circulating coinage (with the exception of the three cantonal specimens, the Swiss 5 francs coin). All but the Stans (1861) and St. Gallen (1874) issues are denominated.

The term Schützentaler has been revived for commercially produced commemorative coins of thaler size offered on the collector's market since the 1980s.

History 
The first shooting medals were struck in honor of the Officers' Shoot held in Langenthal, Bern, in 1822. Shooting medals continued to be made in great numbers, minted in a variety of metals, including silver, bronze, gold and white metal.

The first shooting thalers were cantonal pieces, minted in the 1840s by Grisons and Glarus as sovereign cantons of the Restored Confederacy. 
These two thalers were strictly legal tender, issued under the same conditions as other circulating coins of the period.<ref name=Haas1893>F. Haas, Eine Streitfrage: Sind die eidgenössischen Schützenfestthaler mit der Werthbezeichnung 4 Franken (alte) und 5 Franken in eine Verkehrs-Münzensammlung aufzunehmen oder nicht?" ("A controversial question: should the federal shooting festival thalers with denomination 4 francs (old) and 5 francs be included in a collection of circulating coins or should they not?"), Revue numismatique de suisse 3 (1893), 354f.</ref>

For the 1851 festival, Geneva, already as a canton of the Swiss Confederation but before the federal mint had become fully operational, issued a 10 francs piece. This is sometimes included as a "shooting thaler", even though the shooting festival is in no way alluded to in the coin design.
The Geneva issue of 1851, with a mintage of only 1,000 pieces, is the rarest of the shooting thalers, and has consequently attained the highest collector's value, selling for upward of CHF 1,500.

All nineteenth-century federal shooting thaler issues were minted to legal fineness, and were given the denomination of five francs. But from 1865, Switzerland was a member of the Latin Monetary Union, and since the shooting thalers were not included in the mintages authorized by the Union, they are considered semi-medallic, and not technically legal tender even though they did circulate de facto, and their circulation was tolerated by the federal authorities. 
The classification of the federally issued shooting thalers as circulating currency was discussed controversially in the late 19th century. Haas (1893) argues for their recognition as such. He cites the fact that for three decades, these coins were circulated de facto without intervention on the part of the federal authority. In addition, the 1855 thaler was minted as a regular 5 francs coin with the only exception of the shooting festival being mentioned in the inscription on the coin's edge.

The last thaler of this series is the 1885 Bern issue. After this time, Switzerland was dissuaded from further issuing these semi-official coins by the Latin Monetary Union.

Although the term Schützentaler is mostly reserved for the Swiss tradition, some German mints in the 19th century have also issued commemorative coins for Schützenfeste. Examples include the German States of Baden, Bremen, Frankfurt am Main and Hanover,

In 1927, the Monetary Union ceased to exist. Mintage began on a new series of shooting thalers in 1934 in honor of the shooting festival in Fribourg, and another design was issued in 1939 for the Lucerne festival. The 1934 issue was the last official shooting thaler that matched the circulating counterpart in both diameter and weight. The 1939 issues were not the same size and weight as their circulating counterparts, but both issues were redeemable only at the shooting festival or participating businesses. The federal festival, and with it the production of shooting thalers, was interrupted by the outbreak of World War II.

For the federal festivals of 1949 to 1977, commemorative coins were made but not to official specifications. With the rising popularity of collecting commemorative coins in the 1980s, fine silver coins dubbed Schützentaler have been privately issued for cantonal and federal festivals.

 Cantonal issues 

 Chur (1842) 

Year: 1842
Location: Chur
Denomination: 4 francs
Designer(s): Karl Friedrich Voigt
Diameter: 
Coinage metal: Silver
Mintage: 6,000
Notes: 1,744 pieces melted in 1852, for an upper limit of 4,256 surviving pieces. White metal and zinc pieces are known to have been struck. The zinc pieces were allegedly fixed in the center of a target during the shooting festival. If hit, the shooter would be given a larger award.

 Glarus (1847)

Year: 1847
Location: Glarus
Denomination: 40 batzen
Designer(s): S. Burger, Karl Friedrich Voigt
Diameter: 
Coinage metal: Silver
Mintage: 3,200
Notes: 1,023 pieces melted in 1852, for an upper limit of 2,177 surviving pieces. White metal and zinc pieces are known to have been struck. The zinc pieces were allegedly fixed in the center of a target during the shooting festival. If hit, the shooter would be given a larger award.

 Geneva (1851)

Year: 1851
Location: Geneva
Denomination: 10 francs
Designer(s): Antoine Bovy
Diameter: 
Coinage metal: Silver
Mintage: 1,000
Notes: These coins are not technically "shooting thalers", as the shooting festival is in no way mentioned or alluded to in the design. They are, rather, a batch of 1,000 double thaler (10 francs, 52 grams) coins minted by the canton of Geneva specifically as cash prizes that could be won at the festival.At a mintage of 1,000 pieces, this coin  is today traded for upward of CHF 1,500:  Auctioned for CHF 1,600 in 2018 (Sincona Auction 47 - Part 2, Lot 3378); schweizer-geld.ch: CHF 1750 for "fine" condition, CHF 2500 for "very fine" condition (as of 2020).

  Federal issues (1855–1885)
 Solothurn (1855)

Year: 1855
Location: Solothurn
Denomination: 5 francs
Designers: Friedrich Fisch, S. Burger, Karl Friedrich Voigt 
Diameter: 
Coinage metal: Silver
Mintage: 3,000
Design:
Obv.: Seated figure of Helvetia, holding shield with the federal coat of arms, pointing left, with mountains and ears of corn, HELVETIA5 Fr. 1855, wreath of oak leaves and gentian
Edge: EIDGEN. FREISCHIESEN SOLOTHURN 1855Notes: The design is identical to the regular federal 5 franc issues in use at the time, except for the inscription on the edge. Imitations (made from genuine 5 francs coins of 1850) were reported as early as 1890.

 Bern (1857) 

Year: 1857
Location: Bern
Denomination: 5 francs
Designer(s): Ferdinand Korn
Diameter: 
Coinage metal: Silver
Mintage: 5,191
Design: 
Obv.: Standing figure of a soldier with musket, EHRE IST MEIN HOECHSTES ZIEL. ("Honour is my highest aim"), signature KORN. 
Rev.: Two crossing rifles, Swiss cross in splendour in a wreath, 5 FRANKEN, EIDGENÖSSISCHES FREISCHIESSEN IN BERN 1857. 
Notes: Examples are known to have been struck in white metal. The only known "Class II" specimen of the 1804 dollar, now in the National Numismatic Collection, was struck over a 1857 shooting thaler.

 Zürich (1859) 

Year: 1859
Location: Zürich
Denomination: 5 francs
Designer(s): Ferdinand Korn
Diameter: 
Coinage metal: Silver
Mintage: 6,000
Design:
Obv.: Standing figure of a soldier with rifle, EIDGENÖSSISCHES FREISCHIESSEN, 1859, signature KORNRev.: Two cantonal coats of arms under a federal coat of arms, supported by two lions. ZÜRICH, 5 FRANKEN.

 Nidwalden (1861) 

Year: 1861
Location: Stans, Nidwalden
Denomination: 5 francs
Designer(s): Antoine Bovy, Ferdinand Schlöth
Diameter: 
Coinage metal: Silver
Mintage: 6,000
Design:
Obv.: The planned Winkelried monument in Stans, ARNOLD WINKELRIED, signature A. BOVYRev.: Swiss cross in splendour, EIDGENÖSSISCHES SCHÜTZENFEST IN NIDWALDEN – 1861Notes: Essai pieces are known to have been struck in white metal.

 La Chaux-de-Fonds (1863) 

Year: 1863
Location: La Chaux-de-Fonds, Neuchâtel
Denomination: 5 francs
Designer(s): Antoine Bovy, Jacob Siber
Diameter: 
Coinage metal: Silver
Mintage: 6,000
Design:
Obv.: Seated Helvetia figure, HELVETIA – 5 FRANCSRev.: Neuchâtel cantonal coat of arms (the new coat of arms introduced after the 1857 Neuchâtel Crisis) with two rifles and two flags in saltire and a wreath, under a Swiss cross in splendour, TIR FEDERAL A LA CHAUX-DE-FONDS – JUILLET 1863, signature SIBERNotes: Examples are known to have been struck in white metal.

 Schaffhausen (1865)

Year: 1865
Location: Schaffhausen
Denomination: 5 francs
Designer: Antoine Bovy
Diameter: 
Coinage metal: Silver
Mintage: 10,000
Design:
Obv.: The city personification seated, holding a wreath, with the federal coat of arms on the seat, the Munot tower in the background, her left hand resting on the shoulder of Tell's son holding the pierced apple.
Rev.: The Schaffhausen coat of arms in front of a Swiss cross in a Gothic ornament, EIDGENÖSSISCHES SCHÜTZENFEST IN SCHAFFHAUSEN 1865 – 5 Fr., signature A. BOVY 
Notes: Two examples are known to have been struck in gold. There are forgeries in magnetic alloy.

 Schwyz (1867) 

Year: 1867
Location: Schwyz
Denomination: 5 francs
Designer: Antoine Bovy
Diameter: 
Coinage metal: Silver
Mintage: 8,000
Design:
Obv.: A lion rampant, holding a sword, supporting the cantonal shield. The lion's right back paw standing on a bow andquiver of arrows, the two Mythen peaks in the background, KANTON SCHWYZ, signature A. BOVYRev.: A variety of weapons and four banners crossed behind the federal shield, wreath below, EIDGENÖSSISCHES SCHÜTZENFEST IN SCHWYZ 1867 – 5 Fr. Zug (1869) 

Year: 1869
Location: Zug
Denomination: 5 francs
Designer: Antoine Bovy
Diameter: 
Coinage metal: Silver
Mintage: 6,000
Design:
Obv.: A medieval soldier with sword and half-armour, holding a halberd in his right hand, holding the cantonal banner in his left, HANS LANDWING RETTET DAS PANNER BEI ARBEDO ("Hans Landwing saves the banner at Arbedo"), 1422, signature A. BOVY SC.TRev.:Feathered cap over the federal and cantonal shields, superimposed over crossed rifles and a wreath of oak and laurel, EIDGENÖSSISCHES SCHÜTZENFEST 1869 IN ZUG. 5 Fr.Notes: Four examples are known to have been struck in gold.

 Zürich (1872) 

Year: 1872
Location: Zürich
Denomination: 5 francs
Designer: Fritz Landry
Diameter: 
Coinage metal: Silver
Mintage: 10,000
Design:
Obv.: The city personification standing, resting her right arm on the Zürich shield, her left holding aloft a wreath, at her feet gears and crops and a view of the lake, FÜR FREIHEIT UND VATERLAND ("for liberty and fatherland"), signature F. LANDRYRev.: The federal shield superimposed over a fasces and two crossed rifles, with the motto ALLE FÜR EINEN – EINER FÜR ALLE ("all for one, one for all"), surrounded by a wreath of oak and laurel, EIDGENÖSSISCHES. SCHÜTZENFEST. IN. ZÜRICH. 1872. 5 Fr.Notes: The obverse design was also used for shooting medals issued for the same festival.

 St. Gallen (1874) 

Year: 1874
Location: St. Gallen
Denomination: 5 francs
Designers: Fritz Landry, Antoine Bovy
Diameter: 
Coinage metal: Silver
Mintage: 15,000
Design:
Obv.: Adrian von Bubenberg before the Battle of Murten: A kneeling knight, helmet deposited on the ground, holding the federal standard in his left, pointing with his sword to the left, in the background the rising Sun and the town of Murten, the Bernese troops shown on the right margin, 1474 A 1476, legend A. BOVY F.T
Rev.: Coat of arms of St. Gallen superimposed over crossed rifles and wreath of oak and laurel. Swiss cross above, city view behind, EIDGENÖSS. SCHÜTZENFEST IN S.T GALLEN – 1874
Notes: The scene references an episode before the battle: while the Bernese were in prayer, the sun burst from its cloud cover, and Bubenberg is said to have exclaimed "forth, brethren, God is illuminating our victory!". The same composition was used by Durussel for a tin medal commemorating the battle in the same year.

Lausanne (1876) 

Year: 1876
Location: Lausanne
Denomination: 5 francs
Designer: Edouard Durussel
Diameter: 
Coinage metal: Silver
Mintage: 20,000
Design:
Obv.: Helvetia and the personification of Vaud shaking hands, Vaud holding a wine goblet, cantonal and federal shields, flags and fasces in the background, flanked by grape vines and mountain scenery, 1836 · 1876 (1836 is the date of the first federal shooting festival in Lausanne), POUR · ETRE · FORTS SOYONS · UNIS · ("to be strong, let us be united"), 5 F, signature DURUSSEL
Rev.: View of the city of Lausanne, TIR FÉDÉRAL DE 1876 LAUSANNE
Notes: The reverse design was used on a shooting medal issued for the same festival.

Basel (1879) 

Year: 1879
Location: Basel
Denomination: 5 francs
Designer: Edouard Durussel
Diameter: 
Coinage metal: Silver
Mintage: 30,000
Design:
Obv.: Standing Swiss soldier in Renaissance garb with Bidenhänder and Katzbalger, DAS SCHWERT ZUR HAND IM HERZEN GOTT SO WIRD D. SCHWEIZER NIE Z. SPOTT ("With sword in his hand and God in his heart, so will the Swiss never be disgraced"), signatures LANDERER, DURUSSEL.
Rev.: Basel coat of arms supported by the basilisk in a circle of the 22 cantonal coats of arms , EIDG. SCHÜTZENFEST IN BASEL 1879, 5 Fr.
Notes: Two varieties exist. One variety depicts rays between the sword and leg, while the other does not. Examples are known to have been struck in white metal.

Fribourg (1881) 

Year: 1881
Location: Fribourg
Denomination: 5 francs
Designer: Edouard Durussel
Diameter: 
Coinage metal: Silver
Mintage: 30,000
Design:
Obv.: Two Swiss soldiers, one wielding a crossbow and the other a halberd, supporting Fribourg and Solothurn shields, respectively, seated at the feet of Helvetia holding the federal flag, ENTRÉE DE FRIBOURG & SOLEURE DANS LA CONFÉDÉRATION SUISSE 1481 ("Entry of Fribourg and Solothurn into the Swiss Confederation, 1481"), signature E. DURUSSEL.
Rev.: Swiss cross in splendour above a city view of Fribourg, TIR FÉDÉRAL À FRIBOURG 1881, 5 Fr.

Lugano (1883)

Year: 1883
Location: Lugano
Denomination: 5 francs
Designer(s): Edouard Durussel
Diameter: 
Coinage metal: Silver
Mintage: 30,000
Design:
Obv.: Seated Helvetia with Ticino as river god, Helvetia is holding a sword and federal shield, Ticino an oar with cantonal colours, both are sitting on the Gotthard Tunnel (opened 1882), from which a locomotive is emerging, LIBERTADE INERME É DE' TIRANNI AGEVOL PREDA ("Defenseless liberty is easy prey for tyrants"), 5 Fr, signature E. DURUSSEL. 
Rev.: Shield of Lugano with Gothic ornaments, superimposed over two rifles, two banners and a laurel branch, a feathered cap and cloak resting on the shield, view of the lake and city on the right, TIRO FEDERALE IN LUGANO 1883.

Bern (1885)

Year: 1885
Location: Bern
Denomination: 5 francs
Designers: Edouard Durussel, Christian Bühler
Diameter: 
Coinage metal: Silver
Mintage: 25,000
Design:
Obv.: Standing Helvetia holding sword and federal shield, in front of the Bernese bear, her left hand resting on the bear's shoulder, DEM BUND ZUM SCHUTZ DEM FEIND ZUM TRUTZ ("To protect the federation, to defy the enemy"), signature E. DURUSSEL.
Rev.: Bernese coat of arms superimposed over crossed rifles, wreath of oak leaves and gentian, Swiss cross in splendour above, EIDGENÖSSISCHES SCHÜTZENFEST IN BERN · 1885, 5 Fr., signature C. BÜHLER INV.
Notes: Examples are known to have been struck in white metal.

Federal issues (1934–1939)

The shooting thalers of 1934 and 1939 were the final two specimens issued by the Swiss federal mint. They did have the traditional denomination of 5 francs, but with the added instruction that the coins were only redeemable for this amount at the festival itself. The 1934 coin had the legend Bon de 5 Fr. remboursable avant le 31 août 1934 ("voucher for 5 francs redeemable before 31 August 1934") and the 1939 one had Einlösbar bis 31. August 1939 ("redeemable until 31 August 1939).

They are minted to the new specification for 5 franc coins, reduced from 37 mm, 25 grams Ag 90% (22.5 g fine silver) to 31 mm, 15 grams Ag 83.5% (12.525 g fine silver), and thus no longer of "thaler" size.

Medals

Medals (1829–1853)
No medals were struck  to commemorate the  first modern Eidgenössische Schützenfest  in 1824. Likewise, there is no medal from the second festival in 1827, and only shooting tokens (jetons) but no actual medals from the third in 1828. 
The first silver medal made for a federal shooting festival was issued for the fourth festival of 1829, in Fribourg, as a shooting prize.
For the fifth festival in Bern, in 1830, a purely commemorative silver medal was made.
After this, there is again a gap of a full decade, interrupted only by a lead prize medal sponsored by the town of Ragaz for the 1838 festival in St. Gallen.
The eleventh festival, Chur 1842, was the first for which there is a cantonal issue shooting thaler.
For 1844, in Basel, there was again a commemorative silver medal. The 1849 festival in Aarau issued a commemorative medal, strictly not for the current festival but commemorative of the first festival 25 years before. This was followed by another commemorative medal for the 1853 festival in Lucerne, the final such medal predating the introduction of federal issue shooting thalers in 1855.

The silver medals of 1830 and 1844 are thus the first commemorative silver medals for federal festivals. Of these two medals, numerous copies were made around 1890. It is unclear whether these were forgeries intended to deceive or if they were openly sold as copies at the time, but in either case, they have no distinguishing marks and are difficult to tell from the originals.

Medals (1887–1929)
Silver medals for the federal festivals of 1887–1929 are sometimes referred to as Schützentaler. Most of these were also minted in bronze and in gold. The medals of 1887 to 1901 were minted in full thaler size (or somewhat larger), with a diameter of 45 mm and a silver weight above 38 grams. Beginning in 1904, the medals became smaller, in 1924 reduced to 10 grams of silver (reflecting the silver hausse in the wake of the First World War).

Medals (1949–1990)
The federal festivals had commemorative medals minted in silver and gold. These do not have a face value in francs and are typically called Schützenmedaille rather than Schützentaler.

The designs of the medals for the 1949 to 1979 festivals abandoned the classicist style of Romantic nationalism prevalent in the 19th to early 20th century thalers, and follow the artistic tastes of their time, tending towards minimalistic or postmodernist styles (a trend already perceptible in the modernized designs of the federal 1939 issue and one of the two variants made for the 1924 festival).

The 1949 medal was the last to be produced at the federal mint, still bearing the B mint mark and no fineness stamp, as it was still made at the 83.5% fineness of the 5 francs coins of the time. The medals of 1954 onward are made by Huguenin Frères (HF) and are marked with a 900/1000 fineness stamp.

CIT collector coins (1990 to present)
Beginning in 1982, commemorative medals in gold and silver have been produced for various local shooting events by the private company CIT "Coin Invest Trust" based in Balzers, Liechtenstein, in collaboration with Huguenin Frères (since 2002 named Faude & Huguenin SA) of Le Locle.
The privately produced 1982 "Schützentaler" was offered in Platinum and Palladium alongside silver and saw "phenomenal" sales in the collectors' market especially in the United States. 
Encouraged by this success, CIT Coin Invest went on to produce yearly issues at least nominally associated with selected Swiss shooting events, and in designs loosely reminiscent of the aesthetics of the 19th-century Schützentaler.
Their design for the 1984 Feldschiessen in Oberhasli features the seated 1850 Helvetia design by Friedrich Fisch and a depiction of the Wilhelm Tell monument by Richard Kissling (1895). The 1990 design for the Winterthur festival once again shows the embracing figures of Helvetia and the city personification, and crossed muskets with a laurel wreath, albeit in modernized , slightly cartoonish art style.

The same company has also offered "Schützentaler" for the federal shooting festival from 1990 onward. The 1990 festival still had a separate official commemorative coin in modern design, and the CIT coin was undenominated.

Since 1995, the organizers of the federal shooting festivals have adopted the CIT "shooting thalers" as official, and they have been denominated with CHF 50 (silver) and CHF 500 (gold).

They are commemorative medals aimed at the collector's market, but they are marketed as "Schützentaler". 
Their design has returned to the patriotic themes of the 19th-century issues, and a  nominal face-value in Swiss Francs was re-introduced. These denominations are fictional and not related to any Swiss monetary authority.
The legend convertible à la fête de tir / einlösbar am Schützenfest ("redeemable at the shooting festival") is engraved on the reverse, in imitation of the final federal issues of 1934 and 1939, so that they are technically tokens or vouchers that could be redeemed for the stated amount at the respective festivals.
For the three coins issued 2010–2020, the reverse side of the coins remained unchanged, showing the coin denomination (Fr. 50 for silver, Fr. 500 for gold) in a wreath of oak and gentian and above two crossed muskets with a powder horn, and the legend convertible à la fête de tir / einlösbar am Schützenfest, and a fineness stamp HF (Huguenin), 900 for silver, 999 for gold.

See also 

Swiss franc
Coins of the Swiss franc – Currently minted Swiss coins.

References

Bibliography 

Bruce, Colin R. II Unusual World Coins Iola, Wisconsin: Krause Publications, 2007, 
Krause, Chester L. & Mishler, Clifford Standard Catalog of World Coins 1801–1900, Krause Publications, 1996, 
Krause, Delbert Ray Swiss Shooting Talers and Medals, Whitman Publishing Company, 1965
Martin, Jean L. Les médailles de tir Suisse 1612–1939 Lausanne, 1972
Richter, Jürg Die Schützentaler und Schützenmedaillen der Schweiz, 2005, 
Haberling, Michael Swiss Shooting Festival Coins 1842 - 2015, 2015

External links 
 Swiss Shooting Thalers at zumbo.ch

Switzerland
Commemorative coins
Currencies of Switzerland